Mia Rodriguez is an Australian pop music singer-songwriter. She started her career posting covers and other content on TikTok, and started releasing music in 2019.

Career 

Rodriguez was signed with Michael Chugg's label City Pop Records in late 2019. She issued her first single, "Emotion", in December of that year, as the label's first release. The music video had over 850,000 views on YouTube. Her next single, "Psycho", was released in April 2020. Its music video had over 6,000,000 views on YouTube by the end of the year. She also made her live debut with a performance supporting Sydney-based duo, Lime Cordiale, in April.

Her third single, "Beautiful & Bittersweet" (stylised in all-caps), was released in August 2020, alongside a lyric video. It was produced by Dave Hammer (Lime Cordiale). Greta Brereton of NME Australia reported that the artist had 2 million subscribers on TikTok. The music video was released two months later in October 2020. At the 2020 ARIA Music Awards, held as a virtual ceremony, the singer was a presenter.

Personal life
Rodriguez was brought up in Western Sydney. She is openly pansexual and suffered bullying in her childhood and teenage years as a result of her sexuality and eccentric personality.

Discography

Singles

Videography

Awards and nominations

J Awards 
The J Awards are an annual series of Australian music awards that were established by the Australian Broadcasting Corporation's youth-focused radio station Triple J. They commenced in 2005.

|-
| J Awards of 2020
| Mia Rodriguez
| Unearthed Artist of the Year
| 
|-

Rolling Stone Australia Awards 
The Rolling Stone Australia Awards are awarded annually in January or February by the Australian edition of Rolling Stone magazine for outstanding contributions to popular culture in the previous year.

|-
| 2021
| Mia Rodriguez
| Best New Artist
| 
|-

References 

Australian singer-songwriters
2002 births
Living people
Singers from Sydney